Judge Schwartz may refer to:

Allen G. Schwartz (1934–2003), judge of the United States District Court for the Southern District of New York
Charles Schwartz Jr. (1922–2012), judge of the United States District Court for the Eastern District of Louisiana
David Schwartz (judge) (1916–1989), judge of the United States Court of Claims
Edward Joseph Schwartz (1912–2000), judge of the United States District Court for the Southern District of California
Milton Lewis Schwartz (1920–2005), judge of the United States District Court for the Eastern District of California
Murray Merle Schwartz (1931–2013), judge of the United States District Court for the District of Delaware
Stephen S. Schwartz (born 1983), judge of the United States Court of Federal Claims